Alois Pfeiffer (25 September 1924 – 1 August 1987) was a German trade unionist who served as a European Commissioner in the 1980s.

Pfeiffer was born on 25 September 1924 in Bauerbach in Thuringia. He worked as a forester, and then became a director of the Horticulture, Agriculture and Forestry Union, serving as the union's president from 1969 to 1975.  He also served for a decade on the main board of the German Trade Union Confederation (DGB).

A member of the Social Democratic Party of Germany (SPD), in 1985, he was appointed as one of West Germany's two European Commissioners on the first Delors Commission, as Commissioner  for Economic affairs and employment.

He died in office on 1 August 1987, in Düsseldorf, and on 22 September was replaced as Commissioner by Peter Schmidhuber.

References 

|-

|-

1924 births
1987 deaths
People from Schmalkalden-Meiningen
German trade union leaders
German foresters
Social Democratic Party of Germany politicians
German European Commissioners
European Commissioners 1985–1988